Fuad (Arabic: فؤَاد fū’ād, fou’ād)  (also spelled Fouad, Foud, Fuaad or Foad) is a masculine Arabic given name, meaning "heart" - the beating circulating heart, the concept of "mind and spirit".

Its root word is the Arabic verb fa’ada (Arabic: َفَأَد) meaning "burning or a flame" and lahmun fa'eed - means a "roasted meat on a fire". It is used to describe a "heart that is inflamed with emotion". Therefore, it may share similarities with another Arabic verb fada’ (Arabic: َفَدَى) meaning "to sacrifice" - "to sacrifice, give, risk oneself for (something/ cause)".  

It was borne by two different Kings of Egypt.

Originally an Arabic given name, it became widespread throughout the Middle East during the 9th and 12th centuries.

Notable people 
Art
Fuad Abdurahmanov (1915–1971), Azerbaijani sculptor
Fuad Salayev (1943-), Azerbaijani sculptor

Clergy
Fouad Twal, Latin Patriarch of Jerusalem

Education
Fouad Ajami, Lebanese-born American university professor

Entertainment

Fouad el-Mohandes (1924–2006), Egyptian stage and screen actor
Fouad Awad, Israeli-Palestinian theatre director

Music
Fuat Mansurov (1928–2010), Russian conductor
Fuad al Muqtadir (1980- ), Bangladeshi composer and singer

Nobility
Fuad I of Egypt (1868–1936), known as Fuad I, king of Egypt and Sudan
Fuad II of Egypt (1952–), king of Egypt and Sudan

Politics
Fuad Chehab (1902-1973), former Lebanese president
Fuad Guliyev (1941-), Azerbaijani politician
Fuad Hamza (1899–1951), Saudi Arabian government official
Fuad Hassan (1929-2007), Indonesian politician
Fuad Masum (1938-), Iraqi president
Fouad Mebazaa (1933-), Tunisian politician
Fuad Rouhani (1907–2004), Iranian politician
Fouad Siniora (1943-), Lebanese politician
Fuad Stephens (birth name Donald Stephens) (1920-1976), 1st Chief Minister of Sabah
Fuad Yakubovsky (1908–1975), Soviet Communist party functionary and statesman
Binyamin Ben Eliezer, Binyamin Fuad Ben Eliezer (1926-2016) Israeli politician of Iraqi Jewish Decent

Sports
Fawad Alam (1985-), Pakistani cricketer
Fouad Bachirou (1990-), French footballer
Fuad Anwar (1972-), Saudi Arabian footballer
Fuad Aslanov (1976-), Azerbaijani boxer
Fuad Ibrahim, (1991-) Ethiopian-born American soccer player
Fuad Muzurović, Bosnian football manager
Fuad Reveiz (1963-), Colombian-American football placekicker

Places 
 Port Fuad, Egypt

Fictional characters
Fouad, a fictional character from the FOX television series Family Guy.

In popular culture 
 L.G. FUAD, song by American rock band Motion City Soundtrack

Statistics
The name is mentioned five times in the Quran.

See also
Port Fuad
Fouad (disambiguation) Includes people with surname "Fouad"

References

Arabic masculine given names
Azerbaijani masculine given names
Urdu masculine given names